A Chinese Syllabary Pronounced According to the Dialect of Canton is a book written by Wong Shik-Ling within a few years before being published in Hong Kong, 1941.  It is one of the most influential books on the research of Cantonese pronunciation.  Many Chinese dictionaries later used Wong's Chinese character indices and system of phonetic symbols to denote the Cantonese pronunciation of Chinese characters.  Because of its significance, the book has been reprinted many times after its first publishing.

Content
 Indices of Rime syllabus (finals) of the rime dictionary Guangyun
 Radical-stroke count indices
 Categories of Chinese character according to distinct Cantonese pronunciation syllabus. It is first ordered by finals, second by initials, and third by tones alphabetically.
 A research paper on Cantonese phonetics.
 A suggestion scheme of romanisation of Cantonese
 An English research paper on Cantonese phonetics, completed in Lingnan University, Canton, 1938.

Some characters with multiple pronunciation are commented with meaning, short notes, or usage in each category.

See also
S. L. Wong (phonetic symbols)
S. L. Wong (romanisation)

External links
A Chinese Syllabary Pronounced according to the Dialect of Canton (The Chinese University of Hong Kong)

1941 non-fiction books
Cantonese language